The following are the national records in athletics in Nigeria maintained by the Athletic Federation of Nigeria (AFN).

Outdoor

Key to tables:

+ = en route to a longer distance

h = hand timing

A = affected by altitude

# = not officially recognised by World Athletics

X = unratified due to no doping control or doping violation

OT = oversized track (> 200m in circumference)

Men

Women

Mixed

Indoor

Men

Women

Notes

References
General
World Athletics Statistic Handbook 2022: National Outdoor Records
World Athletics Statistic Handbook 2022: National Indoor Records
Specific

External links
AFN web site

Nigeria
Records
Athletics
Athletics